Sadiq Ali (1910–17 April 2001) Born in Udaipur in British India, he was a freedom fighter. He left home at a young age to pursue his studies at Allahabad University and then joined the freedom struggle and was jailed several times.

During his studies, he saw the Nehru family in Allahabad closely leading the freedom movement and since then started participating in activities with the Congress in the national movement.

He organized a dharna at the Allahabad University to boycott foreign goods and liquor. Then the British government arrested him and sent him to jail.

In 1930, Gandhi's salt law was disregarded and then he was jailed.
He was Office Secretary and then Permanent Secretary of the AICC from 1936 to 1948. During 1942 he stayed with Gandhiji at the Sevagram Ashram and focused on Khadi village industry.  In 1943, he was sentenced to two years under a personal satyagraha.

In 1947, he strongly opposed the partition of India and criticized the Muslim League's Two Nation Theory.  He entered politics after independence.

General Secretary from 1958 to 1962 and again 1964–1969, he was a member of the Provisional Parliament from 1950 to 1952 and of Rajya Sabha from 1957 to 1970. He was also Chief Editor of the AICC Economic Review from 1958 to 1962 and 1964–1969.

Ali served as President of the Indian National Congress (O) from 1971 to 1973, Governor of Maharashtra from 1977 to 1980, Governor of Tamil Nadu from 1980 to 1982, Chairman Rajghat Samadhi Committee, New Delhi 1992–96.

He continued to be Chairman of the Gandhi Smarak Sangrahalaya Samiti since 1985, and Chairman of the Gandhi National Memorial Fund since 1990 and Chairman Sardar Patel Memorial Trust and Council for Communal Harmony.

His well received publications include:  A Survey towards Socialist thinking in the Congress, Democracy and National Integration, The Vision of Swaraj, etc.

He was governor of Maharashtra from 1977 to 1980 and governor of Tamil Nadu from 1980 to 1982.

He died on 17 April 2001.

References

Indian independence activists from Rajasthan
Indian Muslims
Aligarh Muslim University alumni
Indian National Congress politicians
Governors of Maharashtra
Governors of Tamil Nadu
People from Udaipur
University of Allahabad alumni
1910 births
2001 deaths
Rajya Sabha members from Rajasthan
Indian National Congress politicians from Rajasthan